Paula Ribó González (born 30 April 1990), is a Spanish singer, actress and playwright best known for her musical project Rigoberta Bandini, for which she writes, performs, and produces the music. Ribó's multi-departmental professional career started at age seven, when she provided the Iberian Spanish dubbing voice work for the title character of the children animated series Caillou. She continued to work as a voice actress in both Catalan and Castilian for international firms such as Universal and Disney starring in big productions such as Peter Pan and Brave, as well as in film series like The Twilight Saga or The Divergent Series and musical films such as Les Misérables, Sing and Frozen. She also became the regular Spanish-talking voice of Emma Stone, Dakota Fanning and Shailene Woodley.

After graduating Institut del Teatre, she ventured into the music scene in 2011 alongside two college friends with the formation The Mamzelles. They released two studio albums. In parallel to her contribution in film, Ribó created her own theatre production company, directed four plays, started in six, and wrote other four. She also starred in selected Catalan television films and series.

In 2019, Ribó launched her second musical project under the pseudonym Rigoberta Bandini. Her third single, "In Spain We Call It Soledad", released in 2020, became viral on Spotify and launched Bandini into stardom. She achieved national recognition in 2022 placing as the runner-up at the Benidorm Fest in the run to represent Spain in the Eurovision Song Contest 2022 with the song "Ay mamá", which became her first entry in and first number one song on the Spanish charts.

Career 
In 1996, at the age of six, Ribó participated at the Zecchino d'Oro children song competition in Italy with the song "La scatola dei tesori".

She also debuted in voice acting in an early age. Among other works, she voiced Caillou in the Peninsular Spanish dubbing of the homonym series, Chihiro in the Peninsular Spanish dubbing of Spirited Away, and Anna in the Catalan dubbing of Frozen.

Ribó studied theatre at the Institut del Teatre in Barcelona.  In 2010, together with Paula Malia y Bàrbara Mestanza, she founded the music group The Mamzelles. The band released two albums Que se desnude otra (2012) and Totem (2014). In 2012, they created a theatre company, The Mamzelles Teatre.

In 2019, Ribó launched her solo music career under the stage name of Rigoberta Bandini, a fusion of names from human rights activist Rigoberta Menchú and John Fante character Arturo Bandini. In 2020, she rose to prominence in Spain as her single "In Spain We Call It Soledad" became viral in Spotify.

In December 2021, she was selected to participate in the first edition of Benidorm Fest, the song festival organised to determine 's entry for the Eurovision Song Contest, with the song "Ay mamá", placing as the runner-up. The song became her first entry in the Spanish charts, as well as her first single to reach the first position in the Spanish charts.

Ribó has written two "songs of the summer" for Estrella Damm, each with Spanish and Catalan versions. In 2021, she wrote "A ver qué pasa" / "Aviam què passa", which she also performed, and in 2022 wrote "Aquí, ahora y así" / "Aquí, ara i així", which was performed by Santi Balmes, Clara Viñals, and Renaldo. She also wrote the song "Bienvenidos al show", performed by Amaia, in 2022; a few months later, the two announced another song, "Así bailaba", performed together.

Personal life 
Ribó started dating comic Esteban Navarro, from the comedy group , in March 2019. She gave birth to their first child, Nico, on 2 June 2020. Ribó has an older sister.

Her father Pepe has been president of the Federación de Peñas Madridistas de Cataluña, the group that organises official fan groups of Real Madrid in Catalonia, since 2007. Having seen violent comments from Barcelona fans aimed at other Catalans, like Rafael Nadal, for supporting the rival club, Pepe went to the media to say he is not anti-Barcelona and that he was raised by Barcelona fans and just preferred to follow the other team and their valores. In 2022, Ribó and Navarro attended the premiere of Alexia: Labor Omnia Vincit, the documentary mini-series about Barcelona femení captain Alexia Putellas.

Discography

Studio albums & EPs

Singles

 Catalan release

Songwriting credits

Filmography

Film

Television

Commercials

Composition and musical direction

Awards and nominations

References

External links

Catalan dramatists and playwrights
Actresses from Barcelona
Singers from Barcelona
Spanish voice actresses
Living people
1990 births
Zecchino d'Oro singers